Paul Douglas Harrison (born February 11, 1955) is a Canadian former professional ice hockey goaltender. He played in the National Hockey League with the Minnesota North Stars, Toronto Maple Leafs, Pittsburgh Penguins, and Buffalo Sabres between 1975 and 1982, accumulating a record of 28-59–9.

Career 
Harrison was drafted in the third round, 40th overall, by the Minnesota North Stars in the 1975 NHL Amateur Draft. He was also drafted by the World Hockey Association's Cincinnati Stingers, but never played in that league.

After his NHL career finished, Harrison moved back to Timmins and became a police officer for the Ontario Provincial Police. He taught grade-school students about drug awareness through the D.A.R.E. Program.

Personal life 
Harrison and his wife Penny had two daughters, and they lived in Timmins.

Career statistics

Regular season and playoffs

References

External links
 
 Paul Harrison @ hockeygoalies.org

1955 births
Living people
Buffalo Sabres players
Canadian ice hockey goaltenders
Canadian police officers
Cincinnati Stingers draft picks
Dallas Black Hawks players
Ice hockey people from Ontario
Minnesota North Stars draft picks
Minnesota North Stars players
New Brunswick Hawks players
New Haven Nighthawks players
Oshawa Generals players
Pittsburgh Penguins players
Providence Reds players
Rochester Americans players
Sportspeople from Timmins